The Lindalee Tracey Award is an annual film award, presented in memory of Canadian documentary filmmaker Lindalee Tracey to emerging filmmakers whose works reflect values of social justice and a strong personal point of view. Created by Peter Raymont, Tracey's widower and former filmmaking partner, through his production studio White Pine Pictures, the award is presented annually at the Hot Docs Canadian International Documentary Festival; however, the award is not limited to documentary films, but may be awarded to films in any genre, and films do not have to have been screened as part of the Hot Docs program to be eligible.

Winners
2007 - Trevor Anderson, Rock Pockets
2008 - Elizabeth Lazebnik, Abeer
2009 - Will Inrig, The Fantastic Ballet of the Mind and Its Master and Laura Bari, Antoine
2010 - Ayanie Mohamed, Forgotten
2011 - Alexandre Hamel, Clé 56
2012 - Jasmine Oore, Glamour Guts
2013 - Rodrigo Barriuso, For Dorian and Antoine Bourges, East Hastings Pharmacy
2014 - Matt Johnson, The Dirties and Madeleine Grant, The Backward Class
2015 - Yosef Baraki, Mina Walking
2016 - Michael Chen, Lost
2017 - Thyrone Tommy, Mariner
2018 - Fazila Amiri, The Red Bicycle and Tim Tracey, Kreb
2019 - Andy Alvarez, Our Home
2020 - Salar Pashtoonyar, Bad Omen
2021 - Cailleah Scott-Grimes, Between Us
2022 - Avazeh Shahnavaz, The Untouchable

References

External links

Canadian film awards
Awards established in 2007
2007 establishments in Ontario